Castillos is a small city in the Rocha Department of southeastern Uruguay.

Castillos may also refer to:
 Osiris Rodríguez Castillos, an Uruguayan writer, poet, composer and singer
 Reserva Provincial Castillos de Pincheira, a protected natural area in Argentina

See also 
 Los Castillos (disambiguation)
 
 Castillo (disambiguation)